The 1970 Italian Open was a combined men's and women's tennis tournament that was played on outdoor clay courts at the Foro Italico in Rome, Italy. The men's tournament was initially part of the Grand Prix circuit but was withdrawn during the tournament when it became known that the organizers had paid management fees to the competing World Championship Tennis (WCT) organization in order for the WCT players to participate. The women's tournament was a non-tour event, i.e. not part of the Virginia Slims Circuit. The tournament was held from 20 April through 27 April 1970. The singles titles were won by Ilie Năstase and Billie Jean King.

Finals

Men's singles
 Ilie Năstase defeated  Jan Kodeš 6–3, 1–6, 6–3, 8–6

Women's singles
 Billie Jean King defeated  Julie Heldman 6–1, 6–3

Men's doubles
 Ilie Năstase /  Ion Ţiriac defeated  William Bowrey /  Owen Davidson 0–6, 10–8, 6–3, 6–8, 6–1

Women's doubles
 Billie Jean King /  Rosie Casals defeated  Françoise Dürr /  Virginia Wade 6–2, 3–6, 9–7

Notes

References

External links
ITF – Tournament details
ATP – Tournament profile
Official tournament website

Italian Open (tennis)
Italian Open
Italian Open
Italian Open